Victor Ioniță (born May 11, 1983) is a former Romanian tennis player. On 23 May 2005, he reached his highest ATP singles ranking of no. 187. In 2015 he coached Romanian number 1 tennis player, who would later become World No 1, Simona Halep. He formerly coached Sorana Cîrstea, former World No 21.

Challenger finals

Singles: 2 (1–1)

References

External links
 
 
 

1983 births
Living people
Tennis players from Bucharest
Romanian male tennis players
Romanian tennis coaches
21st-century Romanian people